"Mind if I Make Love to You?" is a song written by Cole Porter for the 1956 film High Society, where it was sung by Frank Sinatra to Grace Kelly. It is the one song from the musical not included in any stage version of the show.

1956 songs
Songs written by Cole Porter